The diffusion equation is a parabolic partial differential equation. In physics, it describes the macroscopic behavior of many micro-particles in Brownian motion, resulting from the random movements and collisions of the particles (see Fick's laws of diffusion). In mathematics, it is related to Markov processes, such as random walks, and applied in many other fields, such as materials science, information theory, and biophysics. The diffusion equation is a special case of the convection–diffusion equation, when bulk velocity is zero. It is equivalent to the heat equation under some circumstances.

Statement

The equation is usually written as:

If the diffusion coefficient depends on the density then the equation is nonlinear, otherwise it is linear.

The equation above applies when the diffusion coefficient is isotropic; in the case of anisotropic diffusion,  is a symmetric positive definite matrix, and the equation is written (for three dimensional diffusion) as:

If  is constant, then the equation reduces to the following linear differential equation:

which is identical to the heat equation.

Historical origin 

The particle diffusion equation was originally derived by Adolf Fick in 1855.

Derivation 

The diffusion equation can be trivially derived from the continuity equation, which states that a change in density in any part of the system is due to inflow and outflow of material into and out of that part of the system. Effectively, no material is created or destroyed:

where j is the flux of the diffusing material. The diffusion equation can be obtained easily from this when combined with the phenomenological Fick's first law, which states that the flux of the diffusing material in any part of the system is proportional to the local density gradient:

If drift must be taken into account, the Fokker–Planck equation provides an appropriate generalization.

Discretization

The diffusion equation is continuous in both space and time. One may discretize space, time, or both space and time, which arise in application. Discretizing time alone just corresponds to taking time slices of the continuous system, and no new phenomena arise.
In discretizing space alone, the Green's function becomes the discrete Gaussian kernel, rather than the continuous Gaussian kernel. In discretizing both time and space, one obtains the random walk.

Discretization (Image)
The product rule is used to rewrite the anisotropic tensor diffusion equation, in standard discretization schemes, because direct discretization of the diffusion equation with only first order spatial central differences leads to checkerboard artifacts. The rewritten diffusion equation used in image filtering:

where "tr" denotes the trace of the 2nd rank tensor, and superscript "T" denotes transpose, in which in image filtering D(ϕ, r) are symmetric matrices constructed from the eigenvectors of the image structure tensors. The spatial derivatives can then be approximated by two first order and a second order central finite differences. The resulting diffusion algorithm can be written as an image convolution with a varying kernel (stencil) of size 3 × 3 in 2D and 3 × 3 × 3 in 3D.

See also 
 Continuity equation
 Heat equation
 Fokker–Planck equation
 Fick's laws of diffusion
 Maxwell–Stefan equation
 Radiative transfer equation and diffusion theory for photon transport in biological tissue
 Streamline diffusion
 Numerical solution of the convection–diffusion equation

References

Further reading

Carslaw, H. S. and Jaeger, J. C. (1959). Conduction of Heat in Solids. Oxford: Clarendon Press
Crank, J. (1956). The Mathematics of Diffusion. Oxford: Clarendon Press
Mathews, Jon; Walker, Robert L. (1970). Mathematical methods of physics (2nd ed.), New York: W. A. Benjamin, 
Thambynayagam, R. K. M (2011). The Diffusion Handbook: Applied Solutions for Engineers.  McGraw-Hill

External links 
 Diffusion Calculator for Impurities & Dopants in Silicon 
 A tutorial on the theory behind and solution of the Diffusion Equation.
 Classical and nanoscale diffusion (with figures and animations)

Diffusion
Partial differential equations
Parabolic partial differential equations
Functions of space and time

it:Leggi di Fick